Griots are West African poets, who carry stories in the oral tradition accompanied by music.

Griot may also refer to:

 Ablaye Cissoko, known as "The Griot"
 Alfred Rosmer (1877–1964), born Alfred Griot, an American-born French Communist political activist and historian 
 Griot (film), a 2011 film about Ablaye Cissoko made by Volker Goetze
 Griot (rapper), a Swiss rapper
 Griot (food), a Haitian marinated dish
 The Griot (2021 film), a Nigerian film

See also
Griot Galaxy, former jazz band 
Griot Libertè, a 2004 album by bassist Buster Williams
Griot lute, a musical instrument
Urban Griot, an album by Billy Taylor